Piz Salatschina is a mountain in the Bernina Range of the Alps, located south of Sils im Engadin/Segl in the canton of Graubünden. It lies north of Piz Fora, between the Val Fedoz and the Val Fex.

References

External links
 Piz Salatschina on Hikr

Bernina Range
Mountains of Graubünden
Mountains of the Alps
Mountains of Switzerland
Two-thousanders of Switzerland
Sils im Engadin/Segl